Events in 1963 in Japanese television.

Debuts

See also
1963 in anime
1963 in Japan
List of Japanese films of 1963

References